The 1903 Kentucky State College Blue and White football team represented Kentucky State College—now known as the University of Kentucky—during the 1903 Southern Intercollegiate Athletic Association football season. Led by Jack Wright in his first and only season as head coach, the Blue and White compiled an overall record of 7–1.

Schedule

References

Kentucky State College
Kentucky Wildcats football seasons
Kentucky State College Blue and White football